The 2020 IAAF World Indoor Tour was the fifth edition of the World Athletics Indoor Tour,  the highest series of international track and field indoor meetings.

The Tour retains seven events for 2020, six in Europe and one in the United States. All six 2019 meetings returned, although the order of the meetings has been rearranged from 2019, and the Müller Indoor Grand Prix has returned from Birmingham to Glasgow.

Meetings
A seventh meeting was added in Lievin, France, with the tour was planned leading to the 2020 World Athletics Indoor Championships in Nanjing, China (postponed).

Results

Men's track

Men's field

Women's track

Women's field

References

World Athletics Indoor Tour
Indoor World Tour